Dietrich Wortmann (11 January 1884 – 21 September 1952) was a German wrestler. He competed in the men's freestyle featherweight at the 1904 Summer Olympics.

References

External links
 

1884 births
1952 deaths
German male sport wrestlers
Olympic wrestlers of Germany
Sportspeople from Leipzig
Wrestlers at the 1904 Summer Olympics